Valinol is an organic compound named after, and commonly produced from, the amino acid valine. The compound is chiral and is produced almost exclusively as the S‑isomer (also designated as the L‑isomer), due to the abundant supply of S-valine. It is part of a broader class of amino alcohols.

Synthesis 
Valinol can be generated by converting the carboxylic group of valine to an alcohol with a strong reducing agent such as lithium aluminium hydride, or with NaBH4 and I2 (forming the borane–tetrahydrofuran complex). In both cases the valinol produced can be subsequently purified by short path distillation.

Reactions
Valinol is mainly used to prepare chiral oxazolines, a process which can be achieved via a variety of methods. These oxazolines are principally used as ligands in asymmetric catalysis.

See also
 (S)-iPr-PHOX - an oxazoline ligand made using valinol

References 

Ligands
Primary alcohols
Amino alcohols